Rocellaria is a genus of saltwater clams, marine bivalve molluscs in the family Gastrochaenidae.

Species
Species within the genus Rocellaria include:
 Rocellaria carcellesi (Z. J. de Castellanos, 1970)
 Rocellaria dubia (Pennant, 1777)
 Rocellaria stimpsonii Tryon, 1861

References

Gastrochaenidae
Bivalve genera